Chokri Boudchiche (born 25 September 1963) is a Tunisian wrestler. He competed in the men's freestyle 52 kg at the 1992 Summer Olympics.

References

1963 births
Living people
Tunisian male sport wrestlers
Olympic wrestlers of Tunisia
Wrestlers at the 1992 Summer Olympics
Place of birth missing (living people)